Walery Kosyl (born March 17, 1944) is a former Polish ice hockey goaltender. He played for the Poland men's national ice hockey team at the 1972 Winter Olympics in Sapporo, and the 1976 Winter Olympics in Innsbruck. Kosyl also represented Poland at the IIHF World Championships seven times.

Kosyl was born in Alfeld, Nazi Germany, where his parents, originally from Łódź were forcibly working for the Third Reich.

He played 21 seasons in the Polska Liga Hokejowa with ŁKS Łódź and Legia Warszawa. Kosyl won the Polish championship with Warszawa in 1967.

References

External links
Biography on ŁKS Łódź website

1944 births
Living people
Ice hockey players at the 1972 Winter Olympics
Ice hockey players at the 1976 Winter Olympics
Olympic ice hockey players of Poland
People from Hildesheim (district)
Sportspeople from Łódź
Polish ice hockey goaltenders
Legia Warsaw (ice hockey) players